Roberto Arroyo Gregorio (born 25 August 2003) is a Spanish footballer who plays as a forward for Real Valladolid Promesas.

Club career
Born in Valladolid, Castile and León, Arroyo represented CD Villa de Simancas and Real Valladolid as a youth. He made his senior debut with the reserves on 28 August 2021, starting in a 1–1 Primera División RFEF away draw against SD Logroñés.

Arroyo scored his first senior goal on 29 October 2021, netting the B's second in a 2–0 away win over CF Talavera de la Reina. The following 15 July, he renewed his contract until 2024.

Arroyo made his first team – and La Liga – debut on 28 August 2022, coming on as a second-half substitute for Anuar Tuhami in a 4–0 away loss against FC Barcelona.

References

External links

2003 births
Living people
Spanish footballers
Footballers from Valladolid
Association football forwards
La Liga players
Primera Federación players
Real Valladolid Promesas players
Real Valladolid players